The 2007–08 VCU Rams men's basketball team represented Virginia Commonwealth University during the 2007–08 NCAA Division I men's basketball season. The Rams played in the Colonial Athletic Association.

Schedule

References

VCU
VCU Rams men's basketball seasons
VCU
VCU Rams
VCU Rams